Neowadotes is a genus of Caribbean funnel weavers containing the single species, Neowadotes casabito. It was  first described by G. Alayón G. in 1995, and has only been found in Hispaniola.

References

External links

Agelenidae
Monotypic Araneomorphae genera
Spiders of the Caribbean